Bayac is a commune in the Dordogne department in southwestern France.

Population

See also
Communes of the Dordogne department
Château de Bayac
Gravettian, archaeological industry of the European Upper Paleolithic; the type-site, La Gravette, is near Bayac

References

Communes of Dordogne